Javier Puado Díaz (born 25 May 1998) is a Spanish professional footballer who plays for La Liga club RCD Espanyol. Mainly a right winger, he can also be deployed as a forward.

Club career
Born in Barcelona, Catalonia, Puado joined RCD Espanyol's youth academy in 2014, from UE Cornellà. He made his senior debut with the reserves on 20 August 2016, coming on as a second-half substitute in a 1–1 Segunda División B away draw against UE Llagostera.

On 28 August 2016, in a 0–1 home loss against Valencia CF Mestalla, Puado suffered a knee injury which kept him sidelined for eight months. He returned to action the following 14 May, playing the last 24 minutes and scoring his team's first goal in a 3–2 defeat to CE Sabadell FC, with his side already relegated.

Puado renewed his contract on 21 June 2017, until 2022. The following 28 May, after scoring 12 times and being a key unit in the B side's return to the third tier, he was promoted to the main squad in La Liga.

On 18 August 2018, Puado made his first-team debut by replacing Pablo Piatti in a 1–1 draw at RC Celta de Vigo. He scored his first professional goal on 1 November, the equaliser in a 2–1 away loss against Cádiz CF in the round of 32 of the Copa del Rey.

Puado was loaned to Segunda División club Real Zaragoza on 16 November 2019, as a cover for the injured Raphael Dwamena. Having returned to the RCDE Stadium, he scored 12 goals during the 2020–21 campaign – second best in the squad, only behind Raúl de Tomás' 23 – as Espanyol returned to the top flight after one year out, as champions.

International career
On 6 September 2019, Puado earned his first cap for the Spain under-21 team, featuring the first half of a 1–0 victory in Kazakhstan for the 2021 UEFA European Championship qualifiers. Selected by Luis de la Fuente for the finals, he opened a 3–0 win over Slovenia in the group phase, then added a brace in the 2–1 extra time quarter-final defeat of Croatia.

Puado made his debut for the non-FIFA Catalonia national team on 25 March 2019, against Venezuela at the Estadi Montilivi in Girona; he came on as a substitute and scored a late winner in a 2–1 win. He played his first match with the Spanish senior side on 8 June 2021, scoring in a 4–0 friendly victory over Lithuania in Leganés in which ten of the starters were making their first appearance.

Personal life
Puado's father, Francisco, was also a footballer and a forward. He spent the vast majority of his career in the Spanish lower leagues, having a brief spell in the main division with CA Osasuna.

Career statistics

International

Spain score listed first, score column indicates score after each Puado goal.

Honours
Espanyol
Segunda División: 2020–21

Spain U23
Summer Olympics silver medal: 2020

Individual
UEFA European Under-21 Championship Team of the Tournament: 2021

References

External links

1998 births
Living people
Spanish footballers
Footballers from Barcelona
Association football wingers
Association football forwards
La Liga players
Segunda División players
Segunda División B players
Tercera División players
RCD Espanyol B footballers
RCD Espanyol footballers
Real Zaragoza players
Spain youth international footballers
Spain under-21 international footballers
Spain under-23 international footballers
Spain international footballers
Olympic footballers of Spain
Footballers at the 2020 Summer Olympics
Catalonia international footballers
Olympic medalists in football
Olympic silver medalists for Spain
Medalists at the 2020 Summer Olympics